Binah is a prefecture located in the Kara Region of Togo. The prefecture seat is located in Pagouda.

The cantons (or subdivisions) of Binah include Pagouda, Kétao, Pessaré, Lama-Dessi, Boufalé, Solla, Sirka, Kémérida, and Pitikita.

Towns and villages
Alemande, Aloumboukou, Assire, Boufale, Dewa, Farende, Kadianga, Kagnissi, Kawa, Kemerida, Ketao, Koloum, Konfesse, Koudja, Koukoude, Pagouda, Pessere, Siou Kawa, Sirka, Sola, Solla, Sonde, Tereouda, Tialaide, Tikarè N'Djeï,

References 

 
Prefectures of Togo
Kara Region